Pyrogallol is an organic compound with the formula C6H3(OH)3. It is a water-soluble, white solid although samples are typically brownish because of its sensitivity toward oxygen. It is one of three isomers of benzenetriols.

Production and reactions
It is produced in the manner first reported by Scheele in 1786: heating gallic acid to induce decarboxylation.

Gallic acid is also obtained from tannin. Many alternative routes have been devised. One preparation involves treating para-chlorophenoldisulfonic acid with potassium hydroxide, a variant on the time-honored route to phenols from sulfonic acids.

When in alkaline solution, pyrogallol undergoes deprotonation of one or more phenolic groups.  Such solutions absorb oxygen from the air, turning brown. This conversion can be used to determine the amount of oxygen in a gas sample, notably by the use of the Orsat apparatus.

Polyhydroxybenzenes are relatively electron-rich.  One manifestation is the easy C-acetylation of pyrogallol.

Uses 
One can find its uses in hair dyeing, dyeing of suturing materials and for oxygen absorption in gas analysis. It also has antiseptic properties. Pyrogallol was also used as a developing agent in black-and-white developers, but its use is largely historical except for special purpose applications. Hydroquinone is more commonly used today. It is also used in isolation of inert gases from a mixture of gases, which requires absorption of oxygen from the mixture.

Use in photography 
Though a popular photographic developing agent in the 19th and early 20th centuries, pyrogallol largely fell out of favor around the 1920s, although it was still used by a few notable photographers including Edward Weston. In those days it had a reputation for erratic and unreliable behavior, due possibly to its propensity for oxidation. It experienced a revival starting in the 1980s due largely to the efforts of experimenters Gordon Hutchings and John Wimberley.

PMK 
Hutchings spent over a decade working on pyrogallol formulas, eventually producing one he named PMK for its main ingredients: pyrogallol, Metol, and Kodalk (the trade name of Kodak for sodium metaborate). This formulation resolved the consistency issues, and Hutchings found that an interaction between the greenish stain given to film by pyro developers and the color sensitivity of modern variable-contrast photographic papers gave the effect of an extreme compensating developer. From 1969 to 1977, Wimberley experimented with the Pyrogallol developing agent. He published his formula for WD2D in 1977 in Petersen's Photographic. PMK and other modern pyro formulations are now used by many black-and-white photographers.

The Film Developing Cookbook has examples.

510-pyro 
Another developer mainly based on pyrogallol was formulated by Jay DeFehr. The 510-pyro, is a concentrate that uses Triethanolamine as Alkali, and pyrogallol and phenidone as combined developers. This developer has both staining and tanning properties and negatives developed with it are immune to the callier effect. It can be used for small and large negative formats.

The Darkroom Cookbook (Alternative Process Photography) has examples.

Safety
Pyrogallol use, e.g. in hair dye formulations, is declining because of concerns about its toxicity.
Its  (oral, rat) is 300 mg/kg.

See also
 Catechol
 Gallacetophenone (2,3,4-trihydroxyacetophenone)
 Gallic acid
 Syringol

References

 
Antioxidants
Catechols
Chelating agents
Photographic chemicals
Reducing agents